Chittagong Steel Mills High School is a secondary school in Patenga Thana of Chittagong, Bangladesh. It was established in 1972.

References

Schools in Chittagong